Mehsana Cricket Stadium, officially Sardar Patel Stadium, is a multi-purpose stadium and sports complex at Municipal Ground, Mehsana, Gujarat, India.

History 
Total  was given by the Government of Gujarat while  was provided by the Fourteenth Finance Commission. The floodlights of the stadium was originally proposed to cost additional . The dimmer floodlight installation was proposed in 2022 to lower the costs. The stadium was near completion in 2021. It was officially named Sardar Patel Stadium. It was inaugurated on 19 October 2022 by Gujarat Chief Minister Bhupendrabhai Patel and former deputy chief minister Nitin Patel.

Features 
It has seating capacity of 3000 people where cricket, hockey or football matches can be held. A basketball ground has seating capacity of 250 people where handball and volleyball matches can also be held. Two tennis courts with seating capacity of 250 people are constructed. It has a parking capacity of 250 cars and 1000 two-wheelers.

It is the first cricket stadium built in north Gujarat.

See also 

 Boter Kothani Vav

References 

Mehsana
Cricket grounds in Gujarat
Multi-purpose stadiums in India
Sports complexes
Sports venues in Gujarat
Sports venues completed in 2022
2022 establishments in Gujarat